The Mirage is a play by Edgar Selwyn.  It was the first play presented at the Times Square Theater and debuted on September 30, 1920.  It closed in March 1921 after 192 performances.

Synopsis
Burns Mantle summarized the plot as follows in his 1920-21 Best Plays annual:  "Irene Martin of Erie, Pa., comes to New York in search of work and a broader life. Falling in with the wrong crowd, she gives up the fight to be respectable and for seven years permits a traction magnate to maintain an apartment for her and help her care for the folks at home. By putting a Mrs. before her name she first convinces her family she is married, and later writes them she is a widow. Her Erie sweetheart, having got on in the world, comes to New York to get her. By this time she is tired of the life she is living and eager to return to Erie and respectability, but her sweetheart finds her out. She convinces him, however, that her reformation is complete and he is willing to overlook her past, but her traction magnate succeeds in planting a doubt in her mind that she will ever be able to stand Erie and its group after the magnificence and freedom she has been used to in New York. So she sends the Erie boy home to wait until she feels she is worthy to come to him."

In response to those questioning the plausibility of the plot, Selwyn said it was based on "not at all uncommon" situations in New York.

Original Broadway cast
 Florence Nash as Betty Bond
 Mildred Whitney as Mack
 Florence Reed as Mrs. Irene Moreland
 Reginald Mason as Wallace Stuart
 Alison Bradshaw at Ruth Martin 
 Catharine Proctor as Mrs. Martin
 William Williams as Chester Martin
 Alan Dinehart as Al Manning
 Bert J. Norton as William
 Wanda Lawrence as Mlle. Elise
 Helen Maginnis as Dolly McMann
 Malcolm Williams as Henry M. Galt
 William Bain as Stanley Northrup
 George Le Soir as Edward Godding

Adaptations

The 1931 movie Possessed, starring Joan Crawford and Clark Gable, in an adaptation of the play.   The 1924 silent movie The Mirage was also an adaptation.

References

External links
 

1920 plays